Salil Tripathi is an Indian author and editor. He is Chair of PEN International's Writers in Prison Committee. He is a contributing editor to The Caravan. and Mint.

Biography
Tripathi was born in Mumbai. He was educated at the New Era School in Mumbai and graduated from the Sydenham College of the University of Bombay. Tripathi obtained his MBA from the Amos Tuck School of Business Administration at Dartmouth College in the United States.

Career
Tripathi's articles have appeared in Foreign Policy, The Wall Street Journal, The Far Eastern Economic Review, and The International Herald Tribune.

Books
 Offence: The Hindu Case
 The Colonel Who Would Not Repent: The Bangladesh War and its Unquiet Legacy
 Detours: Songs of the Open Road

2020 Twitter suspension

In December 2020, Tripathi's Twitter account was suspended. Salman Rushdie was among the writers who criticized Twitter for this decision. Shashi Tharoor, Amitav Ghosh, Suketu Mehta, Prashant Bhusan, Paranjoy Guha Thakurta, Aakar Patel, and Nilanjana Roy also criticized Twitter's decision.

PEN International also criticized Twitter's suspension of Tripathi's account and urged Twitter to have more transparent policies.

Awards
Tripathi received the Bastiat Prize (third place) in 2011.

References

External links
 Salil Tripathi on Twitter
 Salil Tripathi website

Living people
Year of birth missing (living people)
Writers from Mumbai
University of Mumbai alumni
Indian editors
Tuck School of Business alumni